James Bruce (1691–1749) was the Chief Justice of Barbados and the son of Alexander Bruce of Gartlet. Through the paternal line James Bruce was a direct descendant of Thomas Bruce 1st Baron of Clackmannan.

Background and ancestry
Sir James Bruce was born in 1691 in Clackmannan to Alexander and Margaret Bruce Earl of Gartlet. Sir James's grandfather, Robert Bruce, was the esquire of Kennet. James Bruce was also an collateral relative of Robert the Bruce through his paternal great grandfather, Archibald Bruce Lord Balfour of Burleigh and husband to Margaret Bruce. Margaret Bruce was the only daughter of Robert Bruce of Wester Kennet, and she continued his lineage through Archibald. Sir James was a descendant of De Brus through an illegitimate daughter of Robert II.

Death
James Bruce died on 19 September 1749 and was buried at All Hallows Staining in London, England; his wife Keturah, who died in 1775, was also buried at All Hallows.  Keturah was the daughter of Joseph FRENCH Esq. and sister of Elizabeth FRENCH who married Thomas SHARPE.

References

Sources
https://books.google.com/books?id=GJ3KCnhqAdMC&pg=PA446&dq=governor+joseph+bruce+barbados
http://www.brucefamily.com/lineage.htm#gartlet

James
James
Scottish merchants
Chief justices of Barbados
18th-century British people
People from Clackmannanshire
1691 births
1749 deaths
18th-century Scottish businesspeople